The 1991 New Zealand rugby union tour of Argentina was a series of matches played in June and July 1991 in Argentina by New Zealand national rugby union team.

The Squad

Results 
Complete list of matches played by New Zealand in Argentina:

Legend: ALU= Alumni - BAC=Belgrano Athletic Club - BCR= Buenos Aires Cricket & Rugby Club - BN= Banco Nacion - CASI=C.A. San Isidro - CP=Club Pucará - CUBA=Club Universitario B.A. - CUR=Curupaytí - CUY=Unión de Rugby de Cuyo - HC=Hindú Club - IRFU=Irish Rugby Football Union - LM=Los Materos - 
LP= La Plata Rugby Club - LT=Los Tilos - NEW=Club Newman - ORC=Olivos Rugby Club - PUY=Club Pueyrredón - RBV=Regatas Bella Vista - SIC=San Isidro Club - UAR=Union Argentina de Rugby - UCR= Unión Cordobesa de Rugby - ULP=Club Universitario de La Plata - URR= Unión de Rugby de Rosario - URT=Unión de Rugby de Tucumán 

ROSARIO: G.Del Castillo: M.Airaldi, G.Romero Acuña, F.Del Castillo, G.Sarrabayrouse; L.Bouza, R.Crexell; F.Rossi, L.Oviedo, M.Sugasti (41' G.García); E.Pitinari, M.Palau (55' P.Baraldi); M.Mansilla (44' P.Manavella), M.Baraldi, V.Jimenez.  NEW ZEALAND: S.Philpott; J.Timu; C.Innes, W.Little, T.Wright; S.Mannix, (G.Bachop), M.Jones (1' P.Henderson), Z.Brooke, A.Earl: C. Tregaskis, G.Whetton (Capt); R.Loe, S.Fitzpatrick, L.Hullena. 

CORDOBA: J.Caminotti; E.Quetglas, J.Arias (41' M.Gil), P.Garzón (capt.), N.Andreossi, M.Menéndez, G.Schroeder; L.Bedoya, J.Simes, J.Durante; E.Giaimo, D.Pereyra; A.Centeno, J.Bernardi, A.Mammana. NUEVA ZELANDA: K.Crowley; J.Kirwan, C.Innes (15' S.Philpott), B.McCahill, J.Timu; G.Fox, P.McGahan; P.Henderson, M.Brewer (70' Z.Brooke), A.Earl; I.Jones, S.Gordon; G.Purvis, W.Gatland, L.Hullena.

 BUENOS AIRES: L.Criscuolo (ALU); M.Habib (BCR), A.Marguerie (NEW), M.Lanfranco (NEW), A.Tolomei (CUBA.); F.Mendez (LT), G.Holmgren (ORC); J.Damio¬li (ULP), R.Etchegoyen (BN), F.Irarrazaval (NEW): M.Lombardi (ALU), G.Ugartemendía (LM); E.Noriega (HC), M.Bosch (Olivos Rugby Club|ORC), A.Rocca (BCR) (capt.).  New Zealand: S.Philpott; J.Kirwan, J.Stanley, W.Little, T.Wright; S.Mannix, (G.Bachop) ; M.Jones, Z.Brooke, A.Earl; G.Whetton (capt.), C. Tregaskis; G.Purvis, S.Fitzpatrick, S.McDowall. 

 TUCUMAN: F.Williams: M.Terán, J.Gianotti, S.Mesón, G.Terán; R.Sauze, R.Zelarrayán; P.Garretón, J.Santamarina (capt.), F.Buabse; P.Buabse, C.Gentile (P.Micheli 59'); L.Molina, R.Le Fort, J.Coria.  NEW ZEALAND: K.Crowley; J.Kirwan, B.Mc.Cahill, J.Stanley, J.Timu; G.Fox, (G.Bachop) ; P.Henderson, M.Brewer (M.Jones 33'), A.Whetton; G.Whetton (capt.), I.Jones; R.Loe, S.Fitzpatrick, S.McDowall.

 ARGENTINA B: G.Angaut (capt.), (LP); G.Jorge (CP), P.Garzón (UCR), M.Allen (CASI), C.Mendy (LT); E.Laborde (CP – 55' F.Mendez - LT), G.Camardón (ALU); M.Ber¬tranou (CUY), P.Camerlinckx (RGV), F.Buabse (URT); M.Lombardi (ALU), P.Buabse (URT); M.Urbano (BCR, M.Bosch (ORC), M.Aguirre (ALU) 
NEW ZEALAND: T.Wright; J.Kirwan (60' S.Philpott), C.Innes, W.Little, J.Timu; G.Fox (capt.), P.McGahan; M.Jones, Z.Brooke, A.Earl; Steve Gordon, C. Tregaskis; G.Purvis, W.Gatland, L.Hullena.

 CUYO: F.Lola; Bazzana, C.Cipitelli (capt.), Cremaschi, E.Saurina; Gioeni, F.Silvestre; M.Bertranou, S.Gómez, M.Cassonel P.Pérez Caffe, G.Correa Llano; P.Miranda, A.Gutiérrez, F.Mendez.  NEW ZEALAND: K.Crowley, J.Timu, J.Stanley, B.McCahill, S.Philpott; S.Mannix, (G.Bachop) ; P.Henderson, M.Jones, A.Whetton; I.Jones, G.Whetton (capt.); R.Loe, S.Fitzpatrick; S.McDowall.

First test 

 MAR DEL PLATA: D.Casagna; G.Desbots, M.Gilardi, D.Meyrelles, J.Chaubel; M.Martínez Etayo, F.Fernández Monteverde; D.Giardelli, O.Lanfranconi, R.Roselli (J.Torrebruno); L.Queral, B.Anastasia; A.Bombini, E.Langdon Sagasta, J.Hernando (L.Reggiardo).  NEW ZEALAND: S.Philpott; J.Timu, J.Stanley (capt.), B.McCahill, C.Innes; S.Mannix, P.McGahan; P.Henderson, Z.Brooke, A.Earl C. Tregaskis, Steve Gordon; G.Purvis, W.Gatland, L.Hullena.

Second test

References

1991 rugby union tours
1991 in Argentine rugby union
1991 in New Zealand rugby union
1991
1991